Võnnu is a village in Ridala Parish, Lääne County, in western Estonia.

Composer Cyrillus Kreek was born in Võnnu in 1889.

References

Villages in Lääne County